Tadeusz Dembonczyk (23 December 1955 – 11 February 2004) was a Polish weightlifter. He won the Bronze medal 56 kg in the 1980 Summer Olympics in Moscow. He was awarded the Bronze after he tied with Andreas Letz after both lifted 265 kg in total and they had weighted 55.6 kg before the competition and were reweighed and Dembonczyk was awarded the bronze.

References

1955 births
2004 deaths
Olympic medalists in weightlifting
Olympic bronze medalists for Poland
Olympic weightlifters of Poland
Weightlifters at the 1980 Summer Olympics
Medalists at the 1980 Summer Olympics
People from Tarnowskie Góry
Polish male weightlifters
20th-century Polish people
21st-century Polish people